The following is the filmography of Indian actor and producer Mohan Babu.

Telugu films

As actor

As a producer 
Vishnu (2003)
Raju Bhai (2007)
Denikaina Ready (2012)
Doosukeltha (2013)

Tamil films

See also
 List of Indian actors
 Telugu cinema

References

Indian filmographies
Male actor filmographies